Daniel Sullivan (born April 26, 1987) is a Canadian-born Italian ice hockey defenceman. He is currently playing with the HC Asiago of the Italian Elite.A.

International
Sullivan was named to the Italy national ice hockey team for competition at the 2014 IIHF World Championship.

References

External links

1987 births
Living people
Asiago Hockey 1935 players
Italian ice hockey defencemen